Ivan Volodymyrovych Losyev (born 26 January 1986 in Brovary) is a Ukrainian racewalker. He competed in the 20 km walk at the 2012 Summer Olympics, where he placed 47th.

Achievements

References

1986 births
Living people
Ukrainian male racewalkers
Olympic athletes of Ukraine
Athletes (track and field) at the 2012 Summer Olympics
Athletes (track and field) at the 2020 Summer Olympics
People from Brovary
World Athletics Championships athletes for Ukraine
Universiade medalists in athletics (track and field)
Universiade silver medalists for Ukraine
Recipients of the Order of Danylo Halytsky
Sportspeople from Kyiv Oblast